The 3rd European Games, informally known as Kraków-Małopolska 2023, is a scheduled international sporting event to be held in Kraków and Małopolska, Poland in 2023. All Olympic sports held at the 2023 European Games will provide qualification opportunities for the 2024 Summer Olympics in Paris, France.

Host selection

At the time of the 2015 European Games, the city of Manchester, United Kingdom expressed its wish to host the 2023 Games. No further interest was expressed since after the 2018 European Championships were awarded to Glasgow, Scotland and the 2022 Commonwealth Games were awarded to Birmingham, England.

In May 2018, the European Olympic Committees (EOC) asserted that the bidding process for the 2023 Games would be open to joint bids from multiple countries.

The EOC launched the bid process on 20 September 2018 after a meeting of the constituent National Olympic Committees in Stockholm. Following the approval of the Bid Document, it was sent to the 50 NOCs in Europe alongside a letter from EOC President Janez Kocijančič inviting applications. The application stage was set to close on 28 February 2019.

In January 2019, Marcin Krupa, the mayor of Katowice, Poland, announced the city's interest hosting the Games, becoming the first candidate city. Soon after, Kazan, the capital of Tatarstan, Russia expressed its interest in hosting the 2023 Games and its intention to submit an application to the EOC. Its bid would be made attractive by the fact the city built much sporting infrastructure when hosting the 2013 Summer Universiade and the 2015 FINA World Aquatics Championships and that a Russian bid has been supported by premier Vladimir Putin.

In February 2019, the application deadline was extended by two months, until 30 April, due to "strong interest from across the continent". In May 2019, after the extended deadline had passed, the EOC again postponed the deadline, this time until the 31 May. No reason was given for the second extension.

In May 2019, the Polish Olympic Committee announced that Kraków would replace Katowice as the Polish bid for the Games following the withdrawal of its bid for the 2022 Winter Olympics and the waning interest in Katowice. The same month, EOC President Janez Kocijančič reiterated his expectation that the host for the 2023 Games would be chosen before the start of the 2019 European Games in Minsk on the 21 June 2019.

After the deadline for bid submission passed on the 31 May 2019, the European Olympic Committees confirmed that only one formal bid had been completed, that of Kraków in collaboration with the province Małopolska. The mayor of Kraków, Jacek Majchrowski, had previously said that the city might decline to run the Games without support from regional and national government.

The official election of the European Games 2023 host took place at an EOC General Assembly in Minsk on 22 June 2019 where it was unanimously decided that Kraków and the surrounding Lesser Poland region would hold the Games. The vote was by a show of hands. The contract with the host city was signed on 17 May 2022.

Votes results

Organisation
On 28 June 2019, six days after Kraków was awarded the Games, the EOC confirmed it had signed a letter of intent with the European Union of Gymnastics to include gymnastics in the upcoming Games. In July 2019, Hasan Arat, the vice-president of the Turkish Olympic Committee, was named chair of the EOC's Co-ordination Commission for the 2023 Games. He said he was "honoured and humbled by the decision".

In October the same year, both the city of Kraków and the Małopolska region signed a letter of intent confirming their joint commitment to the hosting of the Games. In March 2020, Kraków's mayor Jacek Majchrowski warned of cuts to the city budget and impacts on the tourism industry due to coronavirus which could impact the success of the Games.

Funding
In February 2021, the Games faced a funding deadlock when the city of Kraków said it needed financial guarantees from the Polish government in order to proceed with the signing of the host city contract. A spokesperson of the office of the mayor of Kraków, Jacek Majchrowski, said that the city had agreed to host the Games "only on condition that the government subsidised the necessary infrastructure". Government organisers blamed the city's leadership, with Jacek Sasin saying that "Kraków is the organiser of the Games" and that the government is "ready" to support it. Sasin said that the government would commit to sharing funding, but only after Kraków signed the host city contract. However, Majchrowski said that he would not sign the agreement until the government has introduced legislation supporting the event's organisation, leading to suggestions that Katowice, the original bid city, and the Silesia region could end up hosting the Games. In a statement, the EOC said they were "working closely with the organisers" and remained "confident" that Kraków would sign the host city contract.

In early March 2021, the EOC entered into talks with Silesian officials to explore the possibility of the region co-hosting the event. Kraków and the Polish government were reported to have come to an agreement over funding by the end of March 2021.

Participating countries
The following nations are expected to participate:

Venues

Events will take place in the city of Kraków, the surrounding Małopolska region and in Chorzów in the neighbouring Silesia region.

Kraków (twelve sports)

Krzeszowice (one sport)

Chorzów (one sport)

Krynica-Zdrój (four sports)

Nowy Sącz (one sport)

Oświęcim (one sport)

Rzeszów (one sport)

Tarnów (four sports)

Wrocław (one sport)

Zakopane (one sport)

Nowy Targ (one sport)

Games

Sports
The following competitions are scheduled to place:

Calendar

Marketing

Emblem
The official emblem of the games was unveiled on 21 June 2022, exactly one year before the opening ceremony. Designed by Marcin Salawa the emblem depicts a flame containing the towers of St. Mary's Basilica, to represent the ciry of Kraków and the Tatra Mountains, to represent the landscape of the Małopolska region. The colours, taken from the coats of arms of Kraków, and Małopolska, represent fire and water. Fire is said to symbolise action, will, energy, while water symbolises spirituality, emotions and purification.

Motto
The official motto of the games is We are Unity, .

Mascot

“Krakusek” the dragon and “Sandra” the salamander have been chosen as the official mascots for the European Games Kraków-Małopolska 2023. The initiative, which received over 2,400 entries, was open to young people aged 5–15 across the continent. The exceptional dragon design by 15-year-old Katarzyna Biśta from Libiąż, Poland, perfectly encapsulates the local culture and history of Kraków. Complimenting Krakusek, the creation of the black and gold salamander by 10-year-old Gloria Goryl from Wojnicz, Poland, brilliantly portrays a real creature that calls south Poland its home.

Promotion

Sponsors
On 6 July 2021, Atos has been selected by the European Olympic Committees as its official Digital Technology Partner for the 2023 and 2027 editions of the European Games. As part of this partnership, Atos, long-standing supporter of the Olympic Movement, and EOC, the governing body for Europe’s 50 National Olympic Committees, will work together to improve fan engagement. On November 14 2022, representatives of LaLiga and the European Games Organising Committee signed a cooperation agreement to mutually promote sports events and organisations.

Controversy

Former LGBT ideology-free zone
The region of Małopolska, to which the Games were jointly awarded, declared itself an LGBT ideology-free zone in 2019. In August 2020, the Lord Provost of Edinburgh Frank Ross wrote to Kraków's mayor Jacek Majchrowski to confirm the city's opposition to homophobia after calls for a "serious rethink" of the two cities' twinning relationship. In September 2020, a group of European politicians (including Liz Barker, a member of the House of Lords and Terry Reintke and Marc Angel, two MEPs) published a letter addressed to the European Olympic Committees in which they demanded LGBT rights be respected and suggested that the Games should be held in a different location due to the Małopolska region's status. Flemish sports minister Ben Weyts said the region's LGBT-free zone declaration is "incompatible with the values of the Olympic Charter" and that Olympic Committees should not support bids from such regions. The EOC responded, saying that there would be "no discrimination of any kind" and that the Olympic Charter would be respected. The Małopolska region revoked its declaration of an LGBT ideology-free zone on 27 September 2021 and instead adopted a resolution to "oppose any discrimination against anyone for any reason".

See also

European Games
2015 European Games
2019 European Games
2027 European Games
2023 European Para Championships

Notes

References

External links
 
 Krakow 2023 at EOC
 Krakow 2023 on Facebook

 
2023
European Games
European Games
European Games
International sports competitions hosted by Poland
Sports competitions in Kraków
European Games